was a Japanese cyclist. He competed in five events at the 1952 Summer Olympics. He won the gold medal in the team pursuit and in the road race at the 1951 Asian Games.

References

1932 births
2007 deaths
Japanese male cyclists
Olympic cyclists of Japan
Cyclists at the 1952 Summer Olympics
People from Hachinohe
Asian Games medalists in cycling
Cyclists at the 1951 Asian Games
Medalists at the 1951 Asian Games
Sportspeople from Aomori Prefecture
Asian Games gold medalists for Japan